The 1923 Mitcham by-election was held on 3 March 1923.  The by-election was held due to the resignation of the incumbent Conservative MP, Thomas Worsfold.  It was won by the Labour candidate James Chuter Ede.

Result

References

Mitcham by-election
Mitcham by-election
Mitcham,1923
Mitcham,1923
Mitcham,1923
20th century in Surrey